Griebens Reise-Bibliothek (est.1853) was a series of German-language travel guide books  to Europe, founded by Theobald Grieben of Berlin. Some titles occasionally appeared in English or French language editions. Compared with its competitor Baedeker, Griebens was "cheaper and less detailed." A 1914 British reviewer judged it "informative and not bulky, going easily into the coat pocket." Readers included Thomas Wolfe. By the 1950s Griebens was issued by Jürgen E. Rohde of Munich.

List of titles by geographic coverage

Austria

Belgium
  +  index
  (in English) + index

Czech Republic

Great Britain

France
 
 1913 ed.

Germany
 
  (in English)
 
 
 
 
 
 
  (in English)
 
 
 
 
 
 
 
 
 
 
 
  (in English)
 
  (in English)

Greece

Italy
 
 
  + index

Netherlands

Poland

Russia

Scandinavia

Switzerland
  + index
  + index
 1907 ed.
  (in English) + index

United States

References

External links

German books
Travel guide books
Series of books
Publications established in 1853
Tourism in Europe